1984 in Korea may refer to:
1984 in North Korea
1984 in South Korea